Emmelke is a small river of Lower Saxony, Germany. It is a left tributary of the Medem, into which it flows in Ihlienworth.

See also
List of rivers of Lower Saxony

Rivers of Lower Saxony
Cuxhaven (district)
Rivers of Germany